Buffalo Soldiers is a 2001 black comedy war film directed and co-written by Gregor Jordan, based on the 1993 novel of the same name by Robert O'Connor. The film stars Joaquin Phoenix, Ed Harris, Scott Glenn, Anna Paquin and Dean Stockwell. It follows a group of American soldiers stationed in West Germany during 1989 just before the fall of the Berlin Wall.

Buffalo Soldiers had its world premiere at the 26th Toronto International Film Festival on 8 September 2001, and was theatrically released in the United Kingdom by Pathé Distribution on 18 July 2003. The film began a limited release in the United States on 25 July 2003, followed by a wide release on 8 August 2003, by Miramax Films. It earned five nominations at the 6th British Independent Film Awards, including Best British Independent Film and Best Actor for Phoenix.

Plot
In 1989, U.S. Army Supply Specialist (SPC) Ray Elwood is a disillusioned enlisted soldier stationed in Stuttgart, West Germany. With much spare time, he participates in black marketeering and cooking heroin for several corrupt Military Police (MPs) led by the menacing Sergeant Saad. His firm yet empathic Commanding Officer, Colonel Berman, thinks of SPC Elwood as a close friend and has no idea he's stealing Brigade Command supplies and having an affair with his wife. However, Elwood's uneventful existence changes when a new First Sergeant (“Top” / 1SG), Robert E. Lee, joins the Brigade's supply company. Lee is a Vietnam combat veteran who presents a strict and intimidating demeanor, quickly determining that Elwood and his squad are engaged in graft and other criminal activities.

A three-man Army tank crew, under the strong influence of the heroin that Elwood cooked for the MPs, unintentionally kills two soldiers in charge of a weapons truck convoy by inadvertently crashing through a gas station's fuel pumps and detonating them. Elwood stumbles across the trucks, discovers and steals the weapons, and hides them in medical equipment boxes stored at a missile base. When later harassed by Lee for his extravagant barracks room, Elwood's attempt at bribery backfires; Lee subsequently revokes Elwood's privileges, destroys his property, and orders a new, inexperienced and by-the-book Soldier, PFC Knoll, to bunk in his room. To get back at Lee, Elwood begins a sexual relationship with his daughter, Robyn. Lee retaliates by making Elwood destroy his beloved Mercedes-Benz with an M60 machine gun during a live-fire weapons exercise. Lee also boobytraps a locker that is used to hide heroin with a grenade that kills Stoney, one of Elwood's friends.

Elwood sells the stolen weapons to a Turkish gangster, accepting a large amount of raw opium as payment. However, to save Knoll from being killed by Saad in a fight, Elwood is forced to make Saad a business partner in cooking the opium. In order to get the weapons out of the missile base and collect the drugs, Elwood sells out Berman so a competing Infantry Regiment can easily capture their positions during a mobilization/defense operations exercise. Later, Berman reluctantly tells Elwood he has been relieved from Brigade Command but this has given him time to reflect — he'll retire from the Army and buy a vineyard in California.

On 9 November, the night the Berlin Wall comes down, Elwood sneaks to the base swimming pool to meet Robyn while the opium is being cooked by his squad and the MPs. Knoll and Lee arrive. Elwood then discovers Knoll is actually an undercover 2nd Lieutenant from the Inspector General's Office and Criminal Investigation Division. While Knoll escorts Robyn away, she tells him her father intends to kill Elwood, something Knollas a professional officercannot allow. Meanwhile, Saad, intoxicated by the overwhelming opium fumes, provokes a shootout with Special Forces commandos sent to arrest everyone in the drug lab. Upstairs, just as Knoll prevents Lee at gunpoint from pushing Elwood out of a top-floor window, the building explodes from a growing gas leak and increasing heat generated by weapons fire. Elwood and Lee are blown out of the building's top floor by the massive impact. Elwood strangles Lee with his handcuffs and lands on top of him, surviving the fall.

In the aftermath, the Army's top commanders posthumously award Lee a Silver Star and also decorate Elwood, who is transferred to a new assignment in Hawaii. He tells his new commanding officer, who is just as dull-witted as Colonel Berman, that Robyn remains his girlfriend and she will be visiting soon. The film ends with Elwood submitting a requisition order for more excessive supplies.

Cast

Production
Filming took place in Baden-Württemberg, Germany. Several former US Army bases that had recently been handed back to German control, like the depot at Siegelsbach, were used as locations. The U. S. Army declined to support the film, for that reason military vehicles had to be rented from commercial companies and private collectors. Though a US tank platoon is equipped with Leopard 1 tanks.

Release
The world premiere was held at the 2001 Toronto International Film Festival in early September. However, being a satire of the US military, the film's wider theatrical run was delayed by approximately two years because of the September 11 attacks. Angry viewers objected to alleged "anti-American" sentiments of the film, deeming it "unpatriotic". At a press conference a woman threw a water bottle at Anna Paquin. By the time the film was eventually released stateside on July 25, 2003, much of the momentum of the film had dissolved, and the positive reviews of the film did not help its reception.

Reception
Buffalo Soldiers has a rating of 73% on Rotten Tomatoes based on 115 reviews with an average score of 6.55 out of 10. The consensus states "Overall, this caustic comedy hits more of its targets than it misses." The film also has a score of 56 out of 100 on Metacritic based on 35 reviews, indicating "mixed or average reviews".

References

External links
 

2001 films
2001 black comedy films
2000s satirical films
2000s war comedy-drama films
American black comedy films
American satirical films
American war comedy-drama films
British black comedy films
British satirical films
British war comedy-drama films
Cold War films
Film4 Productions films
Films about American military personnel
Films about the Berlin Wall
Films about the United States Army
Films based on American novels
Films based on military novels
Films directed by Gregor Jordan
Films postponed due to the September 11 attacks
Political controversies in film
Film controversies in the United States
Films scored by David Holmes (musician)
Films set in 1989
Films set in West Germany
Films shot in Germany
Military humor in film
Miramax films
Pathé films
2000s English-language films
2000s American films
2001 independent films
2000s British films